Charles Samuel "Sam" Jackson (September 15, 1860 – December 27, 1924) was a prominent newspaper publisher in the U.S. state of Oregon.

Early life, family and career

Born in Deltaville, Virginia, Jackson went west in 1880, settling in Pendleton, Oregon. There, he bought the Pendleton-based East Oregonian, becoming its publisher in 1882 and developing it into a successful regional paper.

In 1886, Sam Jackson and the former Maria Clopton, also originally from Virginia, were married, in Pendleton. They had two sons, Francis C. and Philip L. Jackson, both born in Pendleton.

The Oregon Journal 

In 1902, a group of influential Portlanders persuaded Jackson to sell the East Oregonian and move to Portland to revive the failing Portland Evening Journal. Under his direction, the latter was renamed first the Oregon Daily Journal and then simply The Oregon Journal. The Journal became successful as the main (Democratic-leaning) competitor to Portland's (Republican-leaning) daily paper, The Oregonian. In his first editorial at the helm of the paper, on July 23, 1902, Jackson declared that:

The Journal in head and heart will stand for the people, be truly Democratic and free from political entanglements and machinations, believing in the principles that promise the greatest good to the greatest number – to ALL MEN, regardless of race, creed or previous condition of servitude.... It shall be a FAIR newspaper and not a dull and selfish sheet – [and] a credit to 'Where rolls the Oregon' country.

Jackson led the Journal for 22 years as owner, publisher and editor, until his death in 1924. His son, Philip succeeded him, serving as publisher for 29 years, until his death at the age of 59, in 1953. Maria Jackson remained involved in the business until her death in 1956, at the age of 93.

Honors and legacy

C.S. "Sam" Jackson was inducted into the Oregon Newspaper Hall of Fame in 1979.

In 1917, Jackson donated 88 acres (356,000 m²) on Marquam Hill in Portland to the University of Oregon Medical School; the site, then known as Sam Jackson Park, is now the campus of the Oregon Health & Science University.  The street serving it continues to be named SW Sam Jackson Park Road.

Jackson Tower, former home of The Oregon Journal in downtown Portland, is named for him.

In October 1960, four years after Maria Jackson's death, based on provisions in her will, The Jackson Foundation was established. According to the foundation's website, "The Foundation continues today as a permanent fund governed by the following language in her will:

The income from the trust shall be distributed by the trustees for use within the State of Oregon for charitable, educational or eleemosynary purposes and for the advancement of public welfare. The trustees shall have wide discretion in the selection of the particular purposes for which said distribution shall be made and shall select beneficiaries as they shall deem to be most appropriate and best calculated to promote the welfare of the public of the City of Portland or the State of Oregon, or both.

"Alder Lea", a log house built for Sam Jackson in 1912–15 on a  tract on the Clackamas River, for use as a summer retreat, was added to the National Register of Historic Places in 1981, as the C. S. "Sam" Jackson Log House.

Footnotes

Further reading

 Marshall N. Dana, Newspaper Story: Fifty Years of the Oregon Journal, 1902-1952 (Dust jacket title: ''The First Fifty Years of the Oregon Journal: A Newspaper Story"). Portland: Binfords and Mort, 1951.

External links 
 Oregon Newspaper Hall of Fame page
 The Jackson Foundation, Portland, Oregon

1860 births
1924 deaths
American newspaper publishers (people)
Businesspeople from Portland, Oregon
Oregon Health & Science University people
People from Middlesex County, Virginia
People from Pendleton, Oregon
Philanthropists from Oregon
History of Portland, Oregon
Journalists from Virginia
Editors of Oregon newspapers